Willis Stein & Partners is a private equity firm focused on leveraged buyout transactions for middle-market companies.

The firm's most notable investments have included Ziff Davis, Roundy's, Jays Foods, Lincoln Snacks Company and Petersen Publishing Company (publisher of Motor Trend).

The firm is headquartered in Chicago and was founded in 1995.

History
Prior to founding the firm John Willis and Avy Stein were executives of Continental Illinois Venture Corp. (CIVC), the private equity arm of Continental Illinois National Bank and Trust Company.  When Continental Illinois was acquired in 1994 by Bank of America, John Willis and Avy Stein, who had run the group at Continental Illinois left to form Willis Stein & Partners.  They were quickly able to raise over $300 million of investor commitments.

Investment funds

Since its inception in 1995, Willis Stein has raised three private equity funds with nearly $3.0 billion of investor commitments.  As of 2007, the firm had announced the launch of a fourth fund.  Due to mixed results in its 2000 vintage fund, Willis Stein waited nearly eight years before launching a new fund and when it did so the firm significantly decreased its target fund size relative to its last fund.

 Willis Stein & Partners (1995) - $343 million
 Willis Stein & Partners II (1998) - $840 million
 Willis Stein & Partners III (2000) - $1.8 billion
 Willis Stein & Partners IV (Announced) - $1.0 billion target

Willis & Stein Partners are known for purchasing for profit educational institutions and consolidating resources for additional profit margins. Currently owning over 92 for profit educational with plans to close 22 locations due to low profits.

External links
Willis Stein & Partners (company website)
Willis Stein & Partners Agrees to Acquire Ziff-Davis Publishing for $780 Million - Company Business and Marketing
Willis Stein & Partners Exits National Veterinary Associates.

References

Private equity firms of the United States
Financial services companies established in 1995
Companies based in Chicago